Bull Run is a census designated place in Fairfax County, Virginia, United States. It was first listed as a CDP in the 2020 census with a population of 6,972.

References

Census-designated places in Fairfax County, Virginia
Census-designated places in Virginia